Benigno Hildebrando Chirinos Sotelo (born May 29, 1950) is a Peruvian labor union leader and politician. He currently serves as Chairman of the Workers Confederation of Peru and Secretary-General of the Peruvian Aprista Party, alongside Elías Rodríguez. He was a reelected to the party office once again with Rodriguez in 2019.

In 1990, he was elected to the Peruvian Senate, serving until 1992 due to the Alberto Fujimori's self-coup, which dissolved the bicameral congress and created the unicameral congress.

References

External links
 

American Popular Revolutionary Alliance politicians
1950 births
Living people